Kasugayama may refer to:

Kasugayama stable, defunct stable of sumo wrestlers
Kasugayama Station, railway station in Jōetsu, Niigata, Japan
Kasugayama Castle, Japanese castle  that stood in what is now Jōetsu, Niigata
Kasugayama Primeval Forest, primeval forest near the Kasuga Grand Shrine in Nara, Japan